This is a list of franchise records for the Minnesota Whitecaps during their time in the Premier Hockey Federation.

Regular season

All players

Points

Goals

Assists

Games played

Penalty minutes

Game-winning goals

Power-play goals

Short-handed goals

Defenders

Points

Goaltenders

Games played

Wins

Shutouts

Goals against average

Save percentage

Playoffs

All players

Points

Goals

Assists

Games played

Penalty minutes

Game-winning goals

Power-play goals

Short-handed goals

The Whitecaps have not scored any short-handed goals in the playoffs.

Defenders

Points

Goaltenders

Games played

Wins

Shutouts

Goals against average

Save percentage

Franchise records

Franchise single season 

Note: The 2020–21 season is excluded from records because it was an abbreviated season due to the COVID-19 pandemic.

See also

 PHF awards
 List of Boston Pride records
 List of Buffalo Beauts records
 List of Connecticut Whale (PHF) records
 List of PHF records (individual)

References

Premier Hockey Federation lists
Minnesota Whitecaps